Vyas, Vyasa or Byas, Byans / Vyans is a Sanskrit name of a person, the one who classified Vedas, it also mean:
 Vyasa, the one who classified the Vedas
 Vyasa (title), a title used by a cast in Hindu

Places 
 Vyāsa (crater)
 Byans Rural Municipality, a rural municipality in Darchula district in Nepal
 Byans, a former village development committee in Darchula district, now merged into Byas municipality
 Vyas Municipality, a municipality in Danachun district in Nepal
 Byans valley, a valley in Pithoragarh district, Uttarakhand, India
 Beas river, an Indus tributary in India

Social groups 
 Vyas Brahmins
 Vyas Samman

See also
Byangsi language
Byansis, an ethnic group of Uttarakhand Bhotiya